Wolds Top, also known as Normanby Hill, is the highest point of the Lincolnshire Wolds. It lies some distance to the north of the village of Normanby le Wold in Lincolnshire. The Viking Way passes close by, on a minor road, and there is a radio mast near the summit. The summit is marked with an Ordnance Survey triangulation station, which was erected in 1936, and is now used as part of the Ordnance Survey National GPS System.

Wolds Top is within the Lincolnshire Wolds Area of Outstanding Natural Beauty.

References 

Marilyns of England
Hills of Lincolnshire
Highest points of English counties